"Never Gone" is a song written and recorded by Canadian singer-songwriter Andee for her debut studio album, Black and White Heart (2015). The song was co-written and produced by Sébastien Lefebvre, best known as the rhythm guitarist and backing vocalist for Canadian band Simple Plan. "Never Gone" was released May 19, 2014 as Andee's debut single and the lead single for the album. Upon release, the single was available in both English and French, as a tribute to the co-writers' French Canadian heritage.

"Never Gone" experienced commercial success in Canada, reaching number 40 on the Canadian Hot 100 in August 2014 and also peaking within the top 10 on the national adult contemporary airplay chart. The song's success at the format garnered Andee a nomination for Best New Group or Solo Artist at the 2015 Canadian Radio Music Awards.

Background
Andee, then going by her birth name Andrée-Anne Leclerc, first gained exposure by competing on the fifth edition of Québecois reality singing competition Star Académie in 2012 where she placed in the top eight and drew the attention of Paul Jessop, the vice-president of promotions at Universal Music Canada. In early 2013, Andee encountered Sébastien Lefebvre, who would work with her over the next year as the executive producer of her debut album. In January 2014, Leclerc signed a record deal with Universal Music Canada and adopted the stage name Andee, an anglophone derivative of Andrée-Anne.  "Never Gone" was released as the first single from the project in May 2014.

Reception

Critical
Noah Siegel of New Canadian Music wrote that the song is "a forceful Adele-inspired single that's effective pop in both   English and French versions." Andee was nominated for Best New Group or Solo Artist in the category of AC (adult contemporary radio) at the 2015 Canadian Radio Music Awards for the song.

Commercial
"Never Gone" debuted at number 94 on the Canadian Hot 100 chart dated June 28, 2014. It entered the top 50 in its sixth week, rising 53–43 on the chart dated August 2, 2014. The song reached its peak position of 40 on the chart dated August 23, 2014. "Never Gone" is Andee's only top fifty single to date and spent a total of 20 weeks on the chart. The song was also a multi-format radio hit, peaking at numbers 6, 25, and 15 on the Billboard Canada AC, CHR/Top 40, and Hot AC charts, respectively.

Music video
An accompanying music video was directed by Alon Isocianu and premiered June 26, 2016. A French version was released the same day.

Track listings
Digital download
 "Never Gone" – 2:52

Digital download (French)
 "Never Gone"  – 2:50

Credits and personnel
Credits adapted from liner notes.

Technical
 Recorded by Sébastien Lefebvre at Man of the Hour Studio / Fever Music Group in Montréal, Québec
 Mixed by Serban Ghenea at Mixstar Stuio in Virginia Beach, Virginia
 Mastered by Ryan Morey at Ryan Morey Mastering in Outremont, Québec

Musicians
 Andee (Andrée-Anne Leclerc) – vocals
 Sébastien Lefebvre – guitar, bass, keyboards, programming
 Chantal Bergeron – violin
 Brian Bacon – violin alto
 Christine Giguère – cello
 Nathalie Bonin – violin

Additional personnel
 Strings recorded by Patrick Goyette at Planet Studio
 Strings arranged by Sébastien Lefebvre and Jay Lefebvre

Charts

Weekly charts

Year end charts

Release history

References

2014 songs
2014 debut singles
Universal Music Canada singles
Songs written by Sébastien Lefebvre